The Netherlands competed at the 2011 European Track Championships in Apeldoorn, the Netherlands, from 21 October to 23 October 2011. The event consisted of 13 different disciplines for elite men and women.

List of medalists 

Source

Results

Sprint

Team pursuit

Team sprint

Keirin

Points race

Madison

Omnium

Source

See also

  Netherlands at the European Track Championships
  Netherlands at the 2011 UCI Track Cycling World Championships
  Netherlands at the 2011 UCI Road World Championships

References

2011 in Dutch sport
Netherlands at cycling events
2011 European Track Championships
Nations at the European Track Championships
Nations at sport events in 2011